Chiuro (Lombard: Ciür) is a comune (municipality) in the Province of Sondrio in the Italian region Lombardy, located about  northeast of Milan and about  east of Sondrio, on the border with Switzerland.

The municipality of Chiuro contains the frazioni (subdivisions, mainly villages and hamlets) Castionetto and Casacce.

Chiuro borders the following municipalities: Brusio (Switzerland), Castello dell'Acqua, Lanzada, Montagna in Valtellina, Ponte in Valtellina, Poschiavo (Switzerland), Teglio.

Demographic evolution

References

External links
 www.comune.chiuro.so.it

Cities and towns in Lombardy